FC Dinamo-2 Minsk (Dynama-2 Minsk) was a Belarusian football club based in Minsk.

History
The club serves as a farm club of Dinamo Minsk, giving the club's young players an opportunity for adult competition matches. The club was active in Belarusian Second League during 2000–2002 and again in 2011–2012. In 2002 the club played as Dinamo-BNTU Minsk, reflecting a partnership with Belarusian State Technological University.

There has been two other generations of Dinamo-2 team. The earliest one was a Soviet-era team which occasionally played in Belarusian SSR league. The second one was the 1992 club which, after winning the debut season Belarusian First League, got promoted to the top flight and split from Dinamo to form Belarus Minsk (later renamed to Dinamo-93 Minsk).

References

Belarusian reserve team football
Defunct football clubs in Belarus
Dinamo 2
Association football clubs established in 2000
Association football clubs disestablished in 2012
Football clubs in Minsk
2000 establishments in Belarus
2012 disestablishments in Belarus